Sarcostigma kleinii is a large liana seen extensively in the Western Ghats. An oil is extracted from the seeds. This plant is used widely in Ayurveda.

References

External links

Icacinaceae